The Deacon John Buffington House is a historic house in Swansea, Massachusetts.  It is a -story wood-frame structure, four bays wide, with a side-gable roof, and its chimney centered behind one of the inner bays, behind the main entrance.  Exterior styling is simple, with plain boards around the door, and only minor embellishment on the window framing.  A two-story ell extends to the rear.  The house was probably built c. 1790.  Its first documented owner was John Buffington, a member of the locally prominent Buffington family.  The house exhibits well-preserved but simple vernacular Georgian styling.

The house was listed on the National Register of Historic Places in 1990.

See also
National Register of Historic Places listings in Bristol County, Massachusetts

References

Houses completed in 1790
Houses in Bristol County, Massachusetts
Swansea, Massachusetts
Houses on the National Register of Historic Places in Bristol County, Massachusetts